Jack Simmons (born 4 April 2002) is an Australian professional footballer who plays for Sydney Olympic as a midfielder.

Club career

Newcastle Jets
Newcastle Jets awarded Simmons a scholarship contract on 28 October 2018.

On 20 April 2019 at 17 years of age, Simmons was selected into the squad with a Saturday night clash with Brisbane Roar. He made his first appearance for Newcastle Jets in a 6–1 win over Brisbane.

International career
On 14 February 2019, Jack Simmons was called up for the Australian squad for the 2019 FIFA U-17 World Cup qualification.

Career statistics

References

External links
 Jack Simmons at Soccerway

2002 births
Living people
Newcastle Jets FC players
Dandenong Thunder SC players
A-League Men players
National Premier Leagues players
Association football midfielders
Australian soccer players
People from Bathurst, New South Wales
Sportsmen from New South Wales
Soccer players from New South Wales